Gushki or Gushaki may refer to:
 Gushki, Chaharmahal and Bakhtiari
 Gushki, Hormozgan
 Gushki, alternate name of Kharkushi, Hormozgan Province
 Gushki-ye Bala, Lorestan Province
 Gushki-ye Pain, Lorestan Province

See also
 Kushki (disambiguation)